Haida are an indigenous group who have traditionally occupied , an archipelago just off the coast of British Columbia, Canada, for at least 12,500 years.

The Haida are known for their craftsmanship, trading skills, and seamanship. They are thought to have frequently carried out raids and to have practised slavery. The Haida have been compared to the Vikings by Diamond Jenness, an early anthropologist at the Canadian Museum of Civilization.

In Haida Gwaii, the Haida government consists of a matrix of national and regional hereditary, legislative, and executive bodies including the Hereditary Chiefs Council, the Council of the Haida Nation (CHN), Old Massett Village Council, Skidegate Band Council, and the Secretariat of the Haida Nation. The Kaigani Haida live north of the Canadian and U.S. border which cuts through Dixon Entrance south of Prince of Wales Island in Southeast Alaska, United States; Haida from K'iis Gwaii in the Duu Guusd region of Haida Gwaii migrated north in the early 18th century.

History

Pre-contact 
Haida history begins with the arrival of the primordial ancestresses of the Haida matrilineages in Haida Gwaii some 14,000 to 19,000 years ago. These include SGuuluu Jaad (Foam Woman), Jiila Kuns (Creek Woman), and KalGa Jaad (Ice woman). The Haida canon of oral histories and archaeological findings agree that Haida ancestors lived alongside glaciers and were present at the time of the arrival of the first tree, a lodgepole pine, on Haida Gwaii. For thousands of years since Haida have participated in a rigorous coast-wide legal system called Potlatch. After the Island's wide arrival of red cedar some 7,500 years ago Haida society transformed to centre around the coastal "tree of life". Massive carved cedar monuments and cedar big houses became widespread throughout Haida Gwaii.

18th century 

The first recorded contact between the Haida and Europeans was in July 1774 with Spanish explorer Juan Pérez, who was sailing north on an expedition to find and claim new territory for Spain. For two days in a row, the Santiago sat off the shore of Haida Gwaii waiting for the currents to settle down enough to allow them to dock and set foot on land. While they waited, several canoes of Haida sailed out to greet them, and ultimately to trade with Pérez and his men. After two days of poor conditions, however, the Santiago was ultimately unable to dock and they were forced to depart without having set foot on Haida Gwaii.

The Haida conducted regular trade with Russian, Spanish, British, and American fur traders and whalers. According to sailing records, they diligently maintained strong trade relationships with Westerners, coastal people, and among themselves. Trade for sea-otter pelts was initiated by British Captain George Dixon with the Haida in 1787. The Haida did well for themselves in this industry and until the mid-1800s they were at the centre of the profitable China sea-otter trade.

Although they had gone on expeditions as far as Washington State, at first they had minimal confrontations with Europeans. Between 1780 and 1830, the Haida turned their aggression towards European and American traders. Among the dozens of ships the tribe captured were the Eleanor and the Susan Sturgis. The tribe made use of the weapons they so acquired, using cannons and canoe-mounted swivel guns.

19th century 
British colonial authorities formally annexed Haida Gwaii in 1853 by establishing the Colony of the Queen Charlotte Islands. It was later integrated into the Colony of British Columbia in 1858. Colonial authorities backed their claims using gunboat diplomacy, both in Haida Gwaii and more broadly throughout northeastern Pacific coastal indigenous title territories.

When the Haida and Tongass (sea lion tribe Tlingit) warriors refused to acknowledge American jurisdiction and to hand over those among them who had attacked the Puget Sound communities, a battle ensued in which 26 natives and one government soldier were killed. In the aftermath of this, Colonel Isaac Ebey, a U.S. military officer and the first settler on Whidbey Island, was shot and beheaded on 11 August 1857 by a small Tlingit group from Kake, Alaska, in retaliation for the killing of a respected Kake chief in the raid the year before. Ebey's scalp was purchased from the Kake by an American trader in 1860.

The smallpox epidemic of 1862 
The 1862 Pacific Northwest smallpox epidemic began in March 1862 when a steamship called Brother Jonathan arrived in Victoria from San Francisco containing a passenger infected with smallpox, 1862 March 26. At the time thousands of indigenous people lived in villages outside the walls of Fort Victoria. The disease broke out amongst Tsimshian people in their community near Fort Victoria. This quickly spread into a pandemic. European public health standards at the time are well practiced and adhered to official health standards, including vaccinations and victims isolation. Instead, as the disease spread, Victoria Police burned some one dozen homes, deliberately displacing 200 Haida on 1862 May 13. They went on to burn some 40-50 more indigenous villages the following day.

First Nations from further north had been camping periodically outside the city limits of Victoria to take advantage of trade, and at the time of the epidemic numbered almost 2000, many of whom were Haida. The colonial government made no effort to vaccinate the First Nations in the region nor to quarantine anyone infected. In June 1862, the encampments were forcibly cleared by police, and 20 canoes of Haidas, many of whom were likely already infected with smallpox, were forced back to Haida Gwaii, escorted by gunboats HMS Grappler and HMS Forward. Those infected did not make it home, according to the plans of the colonial governments, and passed on at Bones Bay near Alert Bay. 

Later on a group of copper miners travelled from Bella Coola aboard the Leonede under command of Captain McAlmond. The boat took 12 passengers 1862 December. One of these passengers carried smallpox to Haida Gwaii. This might not have been a disaster should the infected miner have stayed in isolation at the mining site on Sk_'in G_aadll, or Skincuttle Island. Instead the disease was spread throughout Haida Gwaii.

The disease quickly spread throughout Haida Gwaii, devastating entire villages and families, and creating an influx of refugees. The pre-epidemic population of Haida Gwaii was estimated to be 6,607, but was reduced to 829 in 1881. The only two remaining villages were Massett and Skidegate. The population collapse caused by the epidemic weakened Haida sovereignty and power, ultimately paving the way for colonization.

The Potlatch Ban 
In 1885, the Haida potlatch was outlawed under the Potlatch Ban. The elimination of the potlatch system destroyed financial relationships and seriously interrupted the cultural heritage of coastal people. As the islands were Christianized, many cultural works such as totem posts were destroyed or taken to museums around the world. This significantly undermined Haida's self-knowledge and further diminished morale.

20th century 
The government began forcibly sending some Haida children to residential schools as early as 1911. Haida children were sent as far away as Alberta to live among English-speaking families where they were to be assimilated into the dominant culture.

In 1911, Canada and British Columbia rejected a Haida offer whereby in exchange for full rights of British citizenship Haidas would formally join the Dominion of Canada.

Lyell Island protests 

In November 1985, members of the Haida nation protested the ongoing logging of old-growth forests on Haida Gwaii, establishing a blockade to prevent the logging of Lyell Island by Western Forest Products. A standoff between protesters, police and loggers lasted two weeks, during which 72 Haidas were arrested. Images of elders being arrested gained media traction, which raised awareness and support for the Haida across Canada. In 1987, the governments of Canada and British Columbia signed the South Moresby Agreement, establishing the Gwaii Haanas National Park, which is cooperatively managed by the Canadian government and the Haida Nation.

21st century 
In December 2009, the government of British Columbia officially renamed the archipelago from Queen Charlotte Island to Haida Gwaii. The Haida Nation asserts Haida title over all of Haida Gwaii and is pursuing negotiations with the provincial and federal governments. Haida authorities continue to pass legislation and manage human activities in Haida Gwaii, which includes making formal agreements with the Canadian communities established on the islands. Haida efforts are largely directed at the protection of land and water and functioning ecosystems and this is expressed in the protected status for nearly 70% of the million-hectare archipelago. The protected status applies to the landscape and water as well as smaller culturally significant areas. They have also forced a reduction of large-scale industrial activity and the careful regulation of access to resources.

In British Columbia, the term "Haida Nation" often refers to the Haida people as a whole however, it also refers to their government, the Council of the Haida Nation. While all people of Haida ancestry are entitled to Haida citizenship, including the Kaigani who as Alaskans are also part of the Central Council Tlingit Haida Indian Tribes of Alaska government.

Culture

Language 

The Haida language is considered to be an isolate. In the late 19th and early 20th centuries, Haida was de facto banned with the introduction of residential schools and the enforcement of the use of English language. Haida language revitalization projects began in the 1970s and continue to this day. It is estimated that there are only 3 or 4 dozen Haida-speaking people with almost all of them being the age of 70 or older.

Potlatch 

Haida host Potlatches which were intricate economic and social-political processes that include acquisition of incorporeal wealth like names and the circulation of property in the form of gifts. They are often held when a citizen wishes to commemorate an event of importance. For example, deaths of a loved one, marriages, and other civil proceedings. The more important potlatches take years to prepare and can continue for days.

Art 
Haida society continues to produce a robust and highly stylized art form, a leading component of Northwest Coast art. While artists frequently have expressed this in large wooden carvings (totem poles), Chilkat weaving, or ornate jewellery, in the 21st century, younger people are also making art in a popular expression such as Haida manga.

The Haida also created "notions of wealth", and Jenness credits them with the introduction of the totem pole and the bentwood box. Missionaries regarded the carved poles as graven images rather than representations of the family histories that wove Haida society together. Chiefly families showed their histories by erecting totems outside their homes, or on house posts forming the building.

Well known contemporary Haida artists include Bill Reid, Robert Davidson, Michael Nicoll Yahgulanaas, and Freda Diesing amongst others.

Transformation masks 
Transformation masks were worn ceremonially, used by dancers and represented or illustrated the connection between various spirits. The masks usually depicted an animal transforming into another animal or a spiritual or mythical being. Masks were representations of the souls of the mask owner's family waiting in the afterlife to be reborn. Masks worn during ceremonial dances were designed with strings to open the mask, transforming the spiritual animal into a carving of the ancestor underneath. There was also an emphasis on the idea of metamorphosis and reincarnation. With the banning of potlatches by the Canadian government in 1885, many masks were confiscated. Masks and many other objects are considered sacred and designed only for specific people to see. It was unknown who the wearer of the mask was as each mask was made for each individual's soul and spirit animal. Due to the confiscation of the masks and the sacred meaning to each individual who wore the mask, it is unknown if the masks in museums are truly meant to be seen or if they are an aspect of European colonialism and the rejection of Haida religious and spiritual traditions.

Film 
In 2018, the first feature-length Haida-language film, The Edge of the Knife, was released, with an all-Haida cast. The actors learned Haida for their performances in the film, with a two-week training camp followed by lessons throughout the five weeks of filming. Haida artist Gwaai Edenshaw and Tsilhqot'in filmmaker Helen Haig-Brown directed, with Edenshaw and his brother being co-screenwriters, with Graham Richard and Leonie Sandercock.

Christopher Auchter, the nephew of Michael Nicoll Yahgulanaas, has created a number of Haida centered films. In 2017 he directed the animated film "The Mountain of SGaana" inspired by Haida mythology. In spring 2020, "Now Is the Time", a documentary by Haida Film maker Christopher Auchter, was selected to screen at Sundance Film Festival.

Haida manga

Social organization

Moieties 
The Haida nation was split between two moieties, the Raven and the Eagle. Marriages between two people from the same moiety were prohibited. Due to this any children that were born after the marriage would officially become part of the moiety that the mother had come from.  Each group provided its members with entitlement to a vast range of economic resources such as fishing spots, hunting or collecting areas, and housing sites. Each group also had rights to their own myths and legends, dances, songs, and music. Eagles and Ravens were very important to the Haida families as they would identify with one or the other and this would signify what side on the village they would reside on. The family would also own their own property, had specific areas for food gathering. These categories of Eagles and Ravens divided them on an even larger scale, specifying their land, history, and customs.

The Haida social system changed significantly by the end of the nineteenth century. At this point a majority of the Haida had taken nuclear family forms, and members of families belonging in the same moiety (Ravens and Eagles) were permitted to marry each other.

Gender 
The roles of the family varied between men and women. Men were responsible for all of the hunting and fishing, building homes and carving canoes and totem poles. The women's responsibilities were to stay close to home doing a majority of their work on the land. Women were responsible for all of the chores in relation to the keeping of the home. Women were also in charge of curing cedarwood to use for weaving and making clothes. It was also the duty of the women to gather berries and dig for shellfish and clams.

Once a boy hit puberty, his uncles on his mothers' side would educate him on his family history and how to behave now that he was a man. It was believed that a special diet would increase his abilities. For example, duck tongues helped him hold his breath under water, whereas blue jay tongues helped him to be a strong climber.

The aunts on the father's side of a young Haida woman would teach her about her duties to her tribe once she first began to menstruate. The young woman would go to a secluded space in her family home. They believed that by making her sleep on a stone pillow and only allowing her to eat and drink small amounts she would become tougher.

Although not commonly practiced today, it was once customary for young boys and girls entering puberty to embark on vision quests. These quests would send them out alone for days. They would travel through the forests, in hopes of finding a spirit to guide them through their lives. It was believed that boys and girls who were destined for greatness could find unique spirit guides. A successful vision quest was celebrated by the wearing of masks, face paints, and costumes.

Religion 
Haida beliefs are varied and diverse. Modern Haida ascribe to a wide variety of faiths including Protestantism, Catholicism, and Bahá'i. Nihilist, atheist, agnostic, and absurdist perspectives also attend the nation's post-colonial context. Pre-colonial beliefs, however, may still be most popular, and potlatch maintains its elevated situation in Haida society.

Many Haida believe in an ultimate being called Ne-kilst-lass, spelt Nang Kilsdlaas in Skidegate dialect, which can manifest through the form and antics of a Raven. Ne-kilst-lass revealed the world and was an active player in the creation of life. Although Ne-kilst-lass has a generous inclination, they also includes a darker, indulgent, and trickster quality. 

Nang Kilsldaas is merely one of many dozens of supernatural beings who personify a wide variety of forces, objects, places, and phenomena. A few of the most prevalent include K_ing.gii, a deity who presides over the seas; X_yuu, the northeast wind; and Sin SG_aanuwee, a cosmological "super-being" that encompasses all others.

Warfare 
Prior to contact with Europeans, other Indigenous communities regarded the Haida as aggressive warriors and made attempts to avoid sea battles with them. Archaeological evidence shows that Northwest coast tribes, to which the Haida belong, engaged in warfare as early as 10,000 BC. Though the Haida were more likely to participate in sea battles, it was not uncommon for them to engage in hand-to-hand combat or long-range attacks. Hostilities were not always violent, often ritualized and some resulting in Peace Treaties still in force hundreds of years later.

Archeological and written evidence of warfare 
Analyses of skeletal injuries dating from the Archaic period show that Northwest coast nations, particularly in the North where most Haida communities were situated, engaged in battles of some sort, though the number of battles is unknown. The presence of defensive fortifications dating from the Middle Pacific period show that the incidence of battles rose somewhere between 1800 BC and AD 500. These fortifications continued to be in use during the 18th century as evidenced by Captain James Cook's discovery of one such hilltop fortification in a Haida village. Numerous other sightings of such fortifications were recorded by other European explorers during this century.

Causes of warfare 
There were multiple motivations for the Haida people to engage in warfare. Various accounts explain that the Haida went to battle more for revenge and slaves than for anything else. According to the anthropologist Margaret Blackman, warfare on Haida Gwaii was primarily motivated by revenge. Many Northwest coast legends tell of Haida communities raiding and fighting with neighbouring communities because of insults. Other causes included disputes over property, territory, resources, trade routes and even women. However, a battle between a Haida community and another often did not have simply one cause. In fact, many battles were the result of decades old disputes. The Haida, like many of the Northwest coast Indigenous communities, engaged in slave raiding as slaves were highly sought after for their use as labor as well as bodyguards and warriors. During the 19th century, the Haida fought physically with other Indigenous communities to ensure domination of the fur trade with European merchants. Haida groups also had feuds with these European merchants that could last years. In 1789, some Haidas were accused of stealing items from Captain Kendrick, most of which included drying linen. Kendrick seized two Haida chiefs and threatened to kill them via cannon-fire if they did not return the stolen items. Though the Haida community complied at the time, less than two years later 100 to 200 of its people attacked the same ship.

War parties 
The missionary William Collison describes having seen a Haida fleet of around forty canoes. However, he does not provide the number of warriors in these canoes, and there are no other known accounts that describe the number of warriors in a war party. The structure of a Haida war party generally followed that of the community itself, the only difference being that the chief took the lead during battles; otherwise his title was more or less meaningless. Medicine men were often brought along raids or before battles to "destroy the souls of enemies" and ensure victory.

Death in battle 
Battles between a group of Haida warriors and another community sometimes resulted in the annihilation of either one or both of the groups involved. Villages would be burned down during a battle which was a common practice during Northwest coast battles. The Haida burned their warriors who died in battles, though it is not known if this act was done after each battle or only after battles in which they were victorious. The Haida believed that fallen warriors went to the House of Sun, which was considered a highly honorable death. For this reason, a specially made military suit was prepared for chiefs if they fell in battle. The slaves belonging to the chiefs who died in battle were burned with them.

Weapons used in battles 
The Haida used the bow and arrow until it was replaced by firearms acquired from Europeans in the 19th century, but other traditional weapons were still preferred. The weapons that the Haida used were often multi-functional; they were used not only in battle, but during other activities as well. For instance, daggers were very common and almost always the weapon of choice for hand-to-hand combat, and were also used during hunting and to create other tools. One medicine man's dagger that Alexander Mackenzie came across during his exploration of Haida Gwaii, was used both for fights and to hold the medicine man's hair up. Another dagger that Mackenzie obtained from a Haida village was said to be connected to a Haida legend; many daggers had individual histories which made them unique from one another.

Battle armor 
The Haida wore rod-and-slat armour. This meant greaves for the thighs and lower back and slats (a long strip of wood) in the side pieces to allow for more flexibility during movement. They wore elk hide tunics under their armor and wooden helmets. Arrows could not penetrate this armor, and Russian explorers found that bullets could only penetrate the armor if shot from a distance of less than 20 feet. The Haida rarely used shields because of their developed armor.

Villages

Historical Haida villages were:
 Kiusta
 Kung
 Yan
 Hiellan
 Skidegate (Graham Island)
 Cha'atl
 Haina
 Kaisun (Haida: Ḵaysuun Llnagaay)
 Cumshewa (Moresby Island)
 Skedans aka Koona or Q'una.
 Tanu (New Clew), Louise Island
 Ninstints (Sgang Gway, aka Anthony Island)
 Masset The name Masset, received from pre British contact between Haidas and the Spanish, actually includes three separate and adjoining communities,
 Atewaas (Old Massett)
 Jaahguhl
 Kayung
 Hlk'yah GaawGa (Windy Bay) (Lyell Island)
 Klinkwan (Kaigani Haida, Prince of Wales Island)
 Sukkwan (Kaigani Haida, Prince of Wales Island)
 Howkan (Kaigani Haida, Prince of Wales Island)
 Kasaan (Kaigani Haida, Prince of Wales Island)
 Tlell, British Columbia
 Dadens, Langara Island

Notable Haida

 Primrose Adams, artist
 Delores Churchill, artist, basketweaver
 Marcia Crosby, art historian
 Cumshewa, chief
 Florence Davidson, artist and memoirist
 Reg Davidson, carver
 Robert Davidson, carver
 Freda Diesing, carver
 Charles Edenshaw, carver, jeweler and painter
 Gidansda Guujaaw (Gary Edenshaw), artist and politician, former President of the Council of the Haida Nation
 Dorothy Grant, artist, fashion designer
 Jim Hart, hereditary chief of Stasstas Eagle Clan, artist
 Koyah, chief
 Gerry Marks, artist
 Bill Reid, carver, sculptor and jeweler
 Jay Simeon, artist
 Skaay, historian and storytelling expert
 Evelyn Vanderhoop, weaver
 Michael Nicoll Yahgulanaas, artist
 Don Yeomans, artist

Anthropologists and scholars

This is an incomplete list of anthropologists and scholars who have done research on the Haida.
 Marius Barbeau
 Franz Boas
 Robert Bringhurst
 Emily Carr
 Wilson Duff
 Christie Harris
 Charles Hill-Tout
 Bill Holm
 Robert Bruce Inverarity
 Charles F. Newcombe
 John R. Swanton
 Nancy J. Turner
 Marianne Boelscher Ignace

See also
 Haida Heritage Centre
 Haida mythology
 Colonial police action against the people of Haida Gwaii
 Haida Argillite Carvings

References

Bibliography

Further reading
 Blackman, Margaret B. (1982; rev. ed., 1992) During My Time: Florence Edenshaw Davidson, a Haida Woman. Seattle: University of Washington Press.
 Boelscher, Marianne (1988) The Curtain Within: Haida Social and Mythical Discourse. Vancouver: University of British Columbia Press.
 
 
 
 
 Fisher, Robin (1992) Contact and Conflict: Indian-European Relations in British Columbia, 1774-1890. UBC Press.
 
 
 
 Snyder, Gary (1979) He Who Hunted Birds in His Father's Village. San Francisco: Grey Fox Press.
 Stearns, Mary Lee (1981) Haida Culture in Custody: The Masset Band. Seattle: University of Washington Press.
 
 
 Yahgulanaas, Michael Nicoll (2008), Flight of the Hummingbird, Vancouver; Greystone Books.

External links
 Council of Haida Nation
 Central Council Tlingit Haida Indian Tribes of Alaska website

Haida
Haida Gwaii
First Nations in British Columbia
Native American history of Alaska
Native American tribes in Alaska